The title was formed in the WWC promotion in 1994 when Jackhammer won a tournament. The title has stayed with the promotion throughout its various name changes and NWA membership being known as the WWC (World Wrestling Coalition), APWA (Action Packed Wrestling Alliance), RCW (Richmond Championship Wrestling), and NWA New York Heavyweight Championship before the promotion finally relocated to the Commonwealth of Virginia and became known as NWA Virginia. The National Wrestling Alliance recognizes this championship as the Championship of the Continent of North America. Its region is from Canada to Mexico through Puerto Rico.

On January 19, 2008, the NWA Virginia Title was unified with the NWA Southern Pro Wrestling Title to form the NWA Continental Title.

In April 2013, Fusion Wrestling left the NWA and their title was renamed the Fusion Continental Heavyweight Championship.

In January 2014, NWA R.A.G.E. renamed the title the NWA Continental Wrestling Championship.

Title history

See also
List of National Wrestling Alliance championships

References

National Wrestling Alliance championships
North American professional wrestling championships